Pupoides coenopictus is a species of gastropods belonging to the family Pupillidae.

The species inhabits terrestrial environments.

References

Pupillidae